Amanita liquii, also known as the dark-faced ringless amanita, is a species of agaric found associated with firs and pines in south-western China up to an altitude of 4000 m. It fruits from July to September.

This large and robust agaric (cap diameter up to 14 cm, stem length up to 17 cm) is distinguishable by its very dark, sometimes almost black, overall colour. The scientific name is taken from the Chinese hero Li Kui (sometimes spelled Li Qui), who had a dark face.

References
 Yang ZL, Weiss M & Oberwinkler F. (2004) New species of Amanita from the eastern Himalaya and adjacent regions

liquii
Fungi of China
Fungi described in 2004